Holbo Herred (Holbo Hundred) was an administrative division in Frederiksborg County in the northern part of the island of  Zealand, Denmark. It comprised the present-day Gribskov Municipality plus the parish of Nødebo (which today is in Hillerød Municipality). Previously, Holbo was under Strø Herred.

Seal
Holbos seal from 1648 represents Søborg Castle.

Parishes
The following parishes are located in the former hundred.
Annisse Parish
Blistrup Parish
Esbønderup Parish
Gilleleje Parish
Græsted Parish
Helsinge Parish
Mårum Parish
Nødebo Parish
Ramløse Parish
Søborg Parish
Tibirke Parish
Valby Parish 
Vejby Parish

See also
 Hundreds of Denmark

External links
 Holbo.dk
 Map of parishes

Hundreds of Denmark